The 11th NKP Salve Challenger Trophy was an Indian domestic cricket tournament that was held in Mohali from 10 October to 13 October 2005. The series involved the domestic teams from India, which were India Seniors, India A, and India B. India Seniors defeated India B by 3 wickets in the final to become the champions of the tournament.

Also, this tournament marked the last time with team names India Seniors, India A and India B, being used.

Squads

Points Table

Matches

Group stage

Final

References

See also
NKP Salve Challenger Trophy

2005–06 Indian cricket season